Ehkä otin, ehkä en (English: "Maybe I took [something], maybe I didn't") is the third album by Matti Nykänen. It was released in 2006.

Track listing
 "Ehkä otin, ehkä en" – 3.22
 "Sydän villisti lyö" – 3.41
 "Kierros kaikille" – 4.00
 "Tää on mun elämää" – 3.24
 "Mäkikotka ja häkkilintu" – 3.38
 "Mervin ja Matin parempi rakkauslaulu" – 3.01 
 "Samaa nauhaa" – 2.41
 "Lööpistä lööppiin" –	3.04
 "Elämä on laiffii" – 3.33
 "Yllätysten yö"  3.00
 "Maan korvessa" – 5.53

Credits 
 Matti Nykänen – vocals
 Jussi Niemi – guitar, vocals
 Harri Rantanen – bass guitar
 Anssi Nykänen – drums
 Risto Närhi – hammond organ
 Jukka Kautto – guitar
 Mikko Saikkonen – saxophone

References

Matti Nykänen albums
2006 albums